Lütfi Fikri Bey (1872 – 1934) was an Ottoman liberal politician and jurist, who was a member of the Liberal Union. He was a strong critic of the Committee of Union and Progress.

References 

1872 births
1934 deaths
20th-century Turkish politicians
Political people from the Ottoman Empire
Politicians from Istanbul